Amīn al-Dawla Abu'l-Ḥasan Hibat Allāh ibn Ṣaʿīd ibn al-Tilmīdh (1074 – 11 April 1165) was a Christian Arab physician, pharmacist, poet, musician and calligrapher of the medieval Islamic civilization.

Ibn al-Tilmidh worked at the ʻAḍudī hospital in Baghdad where he eventually became its chief physician as well as court physician to the caliph Al-Mustadi, and in charge of licensing physicians in Baghdad. He mastered the Arabic, Persian, Greek and Syriac languages.

He compiled several medical works, the most influential being Al-Aqrābādhīn al-Kabir, a pharmacopeia which became the standard pharmacological work in the hospitals of the Islamic civilization, superseding an earlier work by Sabur ibn Sahl. His poetry included riddles: Abū al-Maʿālī al-Ḥaẓīrī quotes five of them, and a verse solution by al-Tilmīdh to another riddle, in his Kitāb al-iʿjāz fī l-aḥājī wa-l-alghāz (Inimitable Book on Quizzes and Riddles).

Works
 Marginal commentary on Ibn Sina's "Canon"
 Al-Aqrābādhīn al-Kabir
 Maqālah fī al-faṣd

References

Further reading
 

1074 births
1165 deaths
Pharmacologists of the medieval Islamic world
12th-century physicians
Medieval Assyrian physicians
Physicians from the Abbasid Caliphate
Musicians from the Abbasid Caliphate
Iraqi calligraphers
12th-century Arabic poets
12th-century Arabs
11th-century Arabs
Calligraphers from the Abbasid Caliphate